Cristóbal Ricardo Montoro Romero (born 28 July 1950 in Cambil) is a Spanish politician. Hs is a member of the Spanish People's Party. He served as Minister of Finance and Public Administrations of Spain from 22 December 2011 until 1 June 2018, when a vote of no-confidence against Mariano Rajoy ousted his government. His ministry was re-structured in 2016 and the responsibilities of Public Administration were given to the vice president. The office was renamed Minister of Finance and Civil Service.

He was a Member of the European Parliament for the People's Party, part of the European People's Party, and sat on the European Parliament's Committee on Economic and Monetary Affairs. He has represented Madrid in the Spanish Congress since 1993.

He was a substitute for the Committee on Budgets, a member of the Delegation for relations with the countries of the Andean Community and a substitute for the Delegation to the ACP-EU Joint Parliamentary Assembly.

He was appointed Minister of Finance by José María Aznar in April 2000, but he had to abandon the post in April 2004 when his party lost the elections.

Education
 1973: Graduate in Economics from the Autonomous University of Madrid (UAM), he obtained the Extraordinary Prize of Degree
 1981: Doctor in economics (UAM)

Career
 1982-1988: Assistant lecturer in public finance (UAM, 1973–1982) and Deputy professor
 since 1989: Professor of public finance at the University of Cantabria
 Economist and director of studies
 1996-2000: Member of the Boards of Directors of Telefónica, Iberia, Endesa and SEPI
 since 1999: Member of the National Executive Committee of the PP
 1993-1996, 2000-2004, 2008-present: Member of the Congress of Deputies.
 1996-2000: Secretary of State for the Economy
 1996-2000: Spain's representative to various economic and financial organisations
 2000-2004: Minister of the Treasury
 2011-2016: Minister of the Treasury and Public Administrations
 2016–2018: Minister of the Treasury and Civil Service

Decorations
 Knight Grand Cross of the Royal and Distinguished Order of Charles III
 Knight Grand Cross of the  Order of Isabella the Catholic

See also
Ministry of Economy and Finance of Spain
Spanish Government

References

External links

 
 
Biography at Spanish Congress site

|-

1950 births
Government ministers of Spain
Living people
Members of the 5th Congress of Deputies (Spain)
Members of the 6th Congress of Deputies (Spain)
Members of the 7th Congress of Deputies (Spain)
Members of the 8th Congress of Deputies (Spain)
Members of the 9th Congress of Deputies (Spain)
MEPs for Spain 2004–2009
People's Party (Spain) MEPs
People from Jaén, Spain
Economy and finance ministers of Spain
Academic staff of the University of Cantabria
Members of the 12th Congress of Deputies (Spain)
Knights Grand Cross of the Order of Isabella the Catholic